HMAS Rushcutter is a former Royal Australian Navy (RAN) base that served as a depot, radar and anti-submarine training school located at Rushcutters Bay and , in Sydney's eastern suburbs in New South Wales, Australia.

History
Originally the New South Wales headquarters of the Naval Brigade and naval artillery from 1901, the site was used as an administrative depot due to the demolition of Fort Macquarie as facilities for the compulsory peacetime training from 1911-1929. The site remained as the Naval Reserve Depot and the Anti Submarine School was opened there in 1939 and used by the RAN and newly formed Anti-Submarine Branch of the Naval Reserve.

On 1 August 1940, the depot was commissioned as HMAS Rushcutter. During World War II the site housed the Anti-Submarine School, the Radar and Gunnery Instruction School and served as a base for the mosquito fleet: Harbour Defence Motor Launches, the Fairmiles and the Naval Auxiliary Patrol Boats. The training of RAN Radar Operators transferred from HMAS Rushcutter to HMAS Watson in 1943. The technical functions of Radar operation remained at HMAS Rushcutter. At the end of World War II, the site became a training facility for the RAN Experimental Labs and Research Labs.

Current use
In 1979 the Australian Government transferred the site to NSW Government ownership for public recreational use.

See also

Coastal Forces of the Royal Australian Navy
List of former Royal Australian Navy bases

References

Rushcutter
1940 establishments in Australia
Military installations established in 1940
1979 disestablishments in Australia